Guilin North railway station is a train station located in Diecai District, Guilin, Guangxi. Opened in 1938, it was renovated in 2013 and reopened in 10 December 2014. It is the second largest train station in Guangxi after Nanning East railway station. Located in 6 Zhanqian Road, it is on the Lanzhou (Xining)–Guangzhou corridor.

History 
In October 1938, the Hengyang-Guilin North section of the Xianggui Railway was opened to traffic, and Guilin North station began service. At that time, there were 5 lanes for trains. The area of the station was then 365.7 square meters, and the cargo storage was 677 sq. m. large. It was under the Xianggui Railway Administration in January 1941. The station was located at the west end of the current Qunzong road.

In 1944, the Japanese army attacked the region, and in response the administration demolished part of the station, along with other facilities. After the Sino-Japanese war ended, and in November 1947 the station resumed service.

After the establishment of the People's Republic of China, in January 1950 Hengyang Railway Bureau repaired the northern section of the Xianggui railway, and both passenger and cargo service resumed. In 1951, 2 extra cargo lanes were added to Guilin North station. In January 1953 Liuzhou Railway Bureau (now Nanning Railway Bureau) took over the station, and in 1957 a warehouse with construction area 532.26 sq. m. was built.

In 1969 the station area was increased to 884 sq. m., and in March 1971 the station was further expanded. In 1983, Liuzhou Railway Bureau rebuilt the ticket selling booth and passenger waiting hall. In December 1985, the length of the platforms were increased from 310m to 560m.

Because Guilin North Station cannot meet the increasing demand for passenger transportation, the station moved north in 2013. In 2014, the rebuilt Guilin North Station was put into use, and had 9 platforms and 18 tracks, with an elevated waiting hall and a west station hall reserved for the long run. In 2016, the Guilin North Comprehensive Passenger Transport Hub project was announced, and planned for Guilin North station West Square to cover an area of 64,403 square meters, and the total construction area of the West Station Building is 391,890 square meters. An elevated reconstruction of the waiting hall was being planned. After the completion of Guilin North Comprehensive Passenger Transport Hub, it will be the largest comprehensive railway transportation hub in the western region, a highly modern railway passenger special station, and a super large-scale structure integrating high-speed rail, conventional trains, rail transit, bus, rental, and coaches.

Bus services 
Currently, the following bus routes in Guilin service the train stop:

Guilin North bus station

Guilin North station junction bus station

References 

Railway stations in Guangxi
Railway stations in China opened in 1938